In 2017, Lene Kjeldgaard from Venstre failed to become mayor for a third term. Instead Ulla Vestergaard from the Social Democrats became mayor, the first from the party to do so since 2007 municipal reform.  

However, despite the Social Democrats increasing their vote share by 0.5% in this election, a constitution that would see Niels Pedersen from Venstre become mayor, was announced. The constitution were solely made by parties from the traditional blue bloc, namely Conservatives, The New Right, Danish People's Party and Venstre.

Electoral system
For elections to Danish municipalities, a number varying from 9 to 31 are chosen to be elected to the municipal council. The seats are then allocated using the D'Hondt method and a closed list proportional representation.
Thisted Municipality had 27 seats in 2021

Unlike in Danish General Elections, in elections to municipal councils, electoral alliances are allowed.

Electoral alliances  

Electoral Alliance 1

Electoral Alliance 2

Electoral Alliance 3

Results

References 

Thisted